Vietnam has a monsoon-influenced climate typical of that of mainland Southeast Asia. The diverse topography, long latitude (Vietnam spans over 15° of latitude), and influences from the South China Sea lead to climatic conditions varying significantly between regions. Northern Vietnam (including Hanoi) has a humid subtropical climate with the Köppen climate classification and has times to be influenced by cold waves from the Northeast, northern part of Central Vietnam also has times to be influenced by cold waves, southern part of Central Vietnam and Southern Vietnam are hot around year.
 

2/3 of Vietnam has tropical climate. 20% of Vietnam's total surface area is low-elevation coastal area, making the country highly vulnerable to climate change effects and the rising sea levels in particular.

Atmospheric circulation
The atmospheric circulation influencing Vietnam is part of the Southeast Asian monsoon circulation that is characterized by 3 distinct features:
 Being, not only closely associated with the South Asian monsoon, especially in summer, but is also strongly influenced by the East Asian monsoon, especially in winter.
 In addition to being influenced by tropical, subtropical and temperate circulations from the Northern Hemisphere, the atmospheric circulation influencing Vietnam are closely associated with subtropical and tropical circulations from the Southern Hemisphere.
 Vietnam's climate is strongly influenced by its location to the adjacent sea in all seasons.

The two permanent atmospheric pressures that influence the atmospheric circulation of Vietnam are the equatorial low pressure, and the subtropical high pressure. Seasonal pressure centres that influence Vietnam include the Asian continental high pressure, the Aleutian Low, South Asian continental low-pressure centres, and oceanic continental high pressure centres. Across East Asia, the polar front moves southwards in winter, reaching down to 8°N in January as the southern limit while the northern limit of it is 25–27°N in July. Because all of Vietnam lies between the southern and northern limit of the polar front, Vietnam's climate are both influenced by polar air and tropical air (from the tropical convergent zone). In Vietnam, the monsoon circulation is a combination of both the South Asian and Northeast Asian monsoon systems. This leads to four distinct seasons of which Winter (November–March) and Summer (May–September) are the major ones while Spring (April) and Fall (October) are transitional ones.

Seasons
Winter usually lasts from November until March. During winter, polar air originating from the Siberian High penetrate deeply into the low latitudes, facilitated by the eastern Tibetan Plateau that funnels the air southwards in a northeast direction (the cool air is a wind coming from the northeast). At the same time, a low pressure system over Australia strengthens that generates a pressure gradients that intensify cold northeasterly winds. Many cold fronts can penetrate into Vietnam during winter of which there are 3-4 occurrences every month in northern Vietnam. Cold weather, occasionally extreme cold can persist for a long time, being characterized by a long stretch of cloudless or partly cloudy days in the first half of winter or a long stretch of cloudy and drizzly conditions in the latter half of winter. Cold weather occurs more frequently in the north than in the south due to cold fronts penetrate the north more frequently.

Rainy season starts in late April/early May and lasts until October. In summer, the general wind pattern are southwesterly winds in the southern parts of Vietnam and southeasterly winds in northern Vietnam. The predominantly air blocks in Vietnam are the equatorial and tropical blocks that originate from high pressure systems in the Southern Hemisphere, and a maritime tropical block originating from the subtropical high pressure system in the Pacific Ocean (Pacific subtropical high pressure). In addition, during summer, Vietnam is influenced by tropical air from the Bay of Bengal which occurs when a continental low pressure originating from South Asia (South Asian continental low) moves eastwards towards Vietnam, covering almost all of Vietnam and southern China; this causes hot, dry weather in the North Central Coast as westerly winds descend and warm adiabatically on the eastern slopes of the Annamite Range (Truong Son range). On average, 11 storms and tropical low pressures develop in the South China sea during summer of which half are tropical cyclones that originate from the western Pacific. These storms and cyclones then move westwards towards Vietnam. On average, Vietnam is affected by 6–8 typhoons or tropical cyclones per year.

Spring and Fall are transitional seasons. The atmospheric circulation in these seasons represent a transition between winter–summer and summer–winter respectively.

In general, the northern parts of the country have four seasons: winter, spring, summer, and fall (autumn). In the south, only two seasons are present: a dry and a wet season.

Temperature
At the highest altitudes in the Hoang Lien Son range, mean annual temperatures is only . The lowest mean annual temperatures are found in the mountainous areas, where the altitude is higher, and in northern areas, because of their higher latitudes. Because Vietnam is strongly influenced by the monsoon, the mean temperatures in Vietnam are lower than other countries located at the same latitude in Asia.

Generally, mean winter temperatures are below  in many northern locations. In addition to lower insolation in winter, the Northeast Monsoon contributes to colder conditions. Many mountainous areas in the north have experienced subzero conditions. In contrast, temperatures in the Spratly Islands never falls below . The highest temperatures normally occurs in March–May in the south and May–July in the north. This is due to the fact that in the north, drizzle predominates leading to a slight temperature increases in February and March before increasing from April–August while in the south, the temperature increase (from December–February/March) is much larger. Consequentially, the south reaches their highest temperatures in late winter while in the north, they occur in July and August due to this. Temperatures in summer are relatively equal among the northern and southern parts of the country with differences being mostly due to altitude (the decrease in temperature is predominantly due to altitude).

Precipitation

The majority of rainfall occurs during the rainy season, which is responsible for 80%–90% of the annual precipitation. Generally, northern parts of the country receive more rainfall than southern parts of the country. Islands located in the north general receive less rainfall than the adjacent mainland while in the south, this is reversed where islands such as Phú Quốc receive more rainfall than the adjacent mainland. The amount of rainy days in a month usually corresponds with the mean monthly precipitation although in the north and north central coast, drizzle is common in winter (despite being the drier season), leading to higher amounts of rain days. For example, there are more rainy days in the drier season during winter in Yên Bái Province due to drizzle than there are rainy days in the main rainy season. Drizzle is a weather phenomenon that is characteristic of the weather in winter in the north and north central coast. Days with thunderstorms occur 20–80 days per year, which are more common in the south and north, and more common in mountainous areas than coastal delta. Thunderstorms can occur year-round although they are the most common during the rainy season. In the highest peaks in the north in Sa Pa, Tam Dao, and Hoang Lien Son, snowfall can occur.

Depending on the region, the onset of the rainy season (defined as when the monthly average precipitation exceeds ) differs: In the North West and North East, the rainy season beings in April–May with a peak in July–August and ends in September and October. In the Red River Delta (North Delta), the rainy season beings in April–May with a peak in July–August and ends in October and November. On the North Central Coast, the rainy season begins in August and September, reaching a peak in October and November before ending in November and December. For the South Central Coast, the rainy season begins in August and September, reaching a peak in October and November before ending in December. In the Central Highlands, the rainy season begins in April and May that peaks in August before ending in October and November. Finally, the South has its rainy season beginning in May that peaks in September before ending in November.

Regional climate

Based on geographic and climatic conditions, there are 7 different climatic regions in Vietnam: Northwest (Region 1), Northeast (Region 2), North Delta (Red River Delta/Region 3), North Central (North Central Coast/Region 4), South Central (South Central Coast/region 5), Central Highlands (region 6), and the South (region 7). These seven regions are widely accepted within the Vietnamese climatological community. Generally, these 7 different climatic regions are grouped into 2 main types: The North (includes Northwest, Northeast, North Delta (Red River Delta), North Central (North Central Coast)) which includes all areas north of the Hải Vân Pass and the South (South Central Coast, Central Highlands and the extreme south) which includes all areas south of the Hải Vân Pass. These climatic regions are based on time of rainy season and other climatic elements such as insolation, sunshine, temperature, precipitation, and humidity. The diverse topography, wide range of latitudes (Vietnam spans over 15° of latitude), and influences from the South China Sea lead to climatic conditions varying significantly between regions.

Northwest

The Northwest region includes the provinces of Lai Châu, Sơn La, and Điện Biên. The climate is characterized by cold, dry (little drizzly rain), sunny winters in which hoarfrost is common in many years. Summers are hot and rainy, coinciding with the rainy season although there is a high frequency of hot, dry days caused by westerly winds. Valleys are sheltered from wind, leading to a longer dry season and lower annual rainfall. The dry season usually lasts for 4–5 months. The average annual amount of sunshine hours is 1,800 to 2,000. Owing to diverse terrain and climate in this region, this leads to different types of forests being present.

Northeast
The Northeast region includes the northern and northeastern provinces: Lào Cai, Yên Bái, Hòa Bình, Hà Giang, Tuyên Quang, Phú Thọ, Cao Bằng, Lạng Sơn, Bắc Kạn, Thái Nguyên, and Quảng Ninh. The climate is strongly influenced by the northeast monsoon. Winters are cold, cloudy (little sunshine) that is characterized by drizzle. The cold comes earlier than other provinces. Summers are hot and rainy that coincide with the rainy season. However, unlike the northwest, dry conditions are rare due to a low frequency of westerly winds. The rainy season usually lasts from May–September although its duration can vary from 4 to 10 months. In the Hoang Lien Son mountains, winters are cold where snowfall and hoarfrost can occasionally occur. These mountains have the highest rainfall in the country. The average annual amount of sunshine hours is 1,400 to 1,700.

North Delta (Red River Delta)
The North Delta includes the provinces of Phú Thọ, Vĩnh Phúc, Bắc Giang, Bắc Ninh, Hanoi, Hai Phong, Hải Dương, Hưng Yên, Hà Nam, Nam Định, Thái Bình, and Ninh Bình. Winters are characterized as being cold with large amounts of drizzle and little sunshine while summers are hot, rainy with few dry days. Hot, dry conditions caused by westerly winds during summer are rare. The region has a positive water balance (i.e. the precipitation exceeds the potential evapotranspiration). The average annual amount of sunshine hours is 1,400 to 1,700.

North Central (North Central Coast)
The North Central Coast includes the provinces of Thanh Hóa, Nghệ An, Hà Tĩnh, Quảng Bình, Quảng Trị, and Thừa Thiên-Huế. Winters are characterized by cold, cloudy weather with frequent drizzle, being under the influence of the northeast monsoon. Compared to other regions in Northern Vietnam, winters are warmer and wetter due to the influence of the Truong Son Mountains that block the northeast monsoon coming from the Gulf of Tonkin. Summers are characterized by hot, dry weather owing to westerly winds. This is because the Truong Son Mountains also block the southwest monsoon, causing rainfall to occur on the west side of the mountains in Laos and creating a dry Foehn wind that moves east on the eastern slopes in Vietnam. The region averages between 1,500 and 1,700 hours of sunshine per year.

The rainy season occurs in the last 6 months of the year with September and October having the highest rainfall.

South Central (South Central Coast)
Da Nang City, Quảng Nam, Quảng Ngãi, Bình Định, Phú Yên, Khánh Hòa, Ninh Thuận, and Bình Thuận are the provinces that are part of the South Central Coast region. Winters are warm and sunny while summers are hot and dry owing to a high frequency of the westerly winds. The average annual amount of sunshine hours is 2,000 to 2,500. The rainfall pattern is similar to the North Central Coast (region 4).

In contrast to the North Central Coast, the temperature difference between the coldest and hottest months is much smaller. As one progresses southward, the rainy season shifts away from the end of year (occurs more earlier) and vice versa. In general, the rain season starts in September and ends in December or January. Northern parts of the region (Quảng Nam and Quảng Ngãi) receive more rainfall than in the southern parts of the region (Bình Thuận and Ninh Thuận).

Central Highlands
The Central Highlands (Tây Nguyên) includes Kon Tum Province, Gia Lai Province, Đắk Lắk Province, Đắk Nông Province, and Lâm Đồng Province. Owing to the higher altitude, temperatures are lower than other regions at comparable latitudes. Winters are dry while summers are characterized by high rainfall. The average annual amount of sunshine hours is 2,000 to 2,500.

During winter, mean temperatures can fall below . The coldest month is January where minimum temperatures can occasionally fall below . The highest temperatures occur in late winter and early summer. This is usually during March and April.

The South
The South corresponds to the Southeast region, and the Mekong Delta region. It also includes some parts of Bình Thuận Province. The climate of the south is strongly influenced by the southwest monsoon. The climate of this region is characterized by high temperatures year round and sunny weather. Mean annual temperatures in coastal areas are around  that is fairly even throughout the year with little difference between the coldest and hottest months of the year. The average annual sunshine hours ranges from 2,400 to 3,000. Sunshine hours are higher in the northeastern parts of the region where they exceed over 2,700 hours per year while in the west, it is around 2,300 hours per year.

Extremes

Absolute record low ground temperatures tend to be  lower than record low air temperatures but absolute record high ground temperatures tend to be over  higher than the air temperature.

Climate change

Statistics

Temperature

Precipitation

Overall averages

Natural disasters
Climate extremes include heat waves, cold surges and frosts, floods, droughts, and severe storms.

See also
 Geography of Vietnam

References

Books

External links
 National Center for Hydro-Meteorological Forecasting (in Vietnamese)
 Vietnam Institute of Meteorology, Hydrology and Climate change (in Vietnamese)

 
Vietnam
Vietnam